In mathematics, the Hahn–Exton q-Bessel function or the third Jackson q-Bessel function is a q-analog of the Bessel function, and satisfies the Hahn-Exton q-difference equation.

The Hahn–Exton q-Bessel function is given by 

 is the basic hypergeometric function.

Properties

Zeros
Koelink and Swarttouw proved that  has infinite number of real zeros.
Zeros of the Hahn-Exton q-Bessel function appear in a discrete analog of Daniel Bernoulli's problem about free vibrations of a lump loaded chain

Derivatives

Recurrence Relation
The Hahn–Exton q-Bessel function has the following recurrence relation (see ):

Alternative Representations

Integral Representation
The Hahn–Exton q-Bessel function has the following integral representation (see ):

For a contour integral representation, see .

Hypergeometric Representation
The Hahn–Exton q-Bessel function has the following hypergeometric representation (see ):

References
 
 
 
 
 
 
 
 
 

Special functions
Q-analogs